Marie Brennan is the pseudonym of Bryn Neuenschwander, an American fantasy author. Her works include the Doppelganger duology (Doppelganger and its sequel Warrior and Witch, respectively retitled Warrior and Witch on later printings); the Onyx Court series; the Memoirs of Lady Trent series; and numerous short stories. The first of the Onyx Court novels, Midnight Never Come, published on 1 May 2008 in the United Kingdom, and 1 June 2008 in the United States, received a four star-review from SFX Magazine. The Lady Trent series was a finalist for the Hugo Best Series award in 2018.

As an undergraduate at Harvard University, Neuenschwander served as co-chair of the Harvard-Radcliffe Science Fiction Association. After graduating from Harvard, she pursued graduate studies at Indiana University Bloomington, studying folklore and anthropology; in 2008 she left graduate school without completing her PhD, in order to pursue writing full-time.

Bibliography

Novels
 Doppelganger (2006) (reissued as Warrior in 2008)
 Warrior and Witch (2006) (reissued as Witch in 2008)

Onyx Court
 "In London's Shadow" (Onyx Court Omnibus) (2016)
 Midnight Never Come (2008)
 In Ashes Lie (2009)
 A Star Shall Fall (2010)
 With Fate Conspire (2011)

Memoirs of Lady Trent
 A Natural History of Dragons (2013)
 The Tropic of Serpents (2014)
 Voyage of the Basilisk (2015)
 In the Labyrinth of Drakes (2016)
 Within the Sanctuary of Wings (2017)

 "From the Editorial Page of the Falchester Weekly Review" (short story) (2016)
 "On the Impurity of Dragon-kind" (short story) (2019)
 "The Long Fall" (described by Brennan as a piece of "authorial fanfic") (2020)
 Turning Darkness Into Light (spinoff novel) (August 2019)

The Rook and Rose Trilogy (writing with Alyc Helms as M.A. Carrick)
 The Mask of Mirrors (2021)
 The Liar's Knot (2021)

Driftwood (2020)
Framework, 1 new story, and short stories freely available on Web except Into The Wind:
 Driftwood (2009, Beneath Ceaseless Skies, April 2009)
 A Heretic By Degrees (2008, Orson Scott Card's Intergalactic Medicine Show, December 2008)
 Into The Wind (2017, Children of a Different Sky, edited by Alma Alexander)
 The Ascent of Unreason (2021, Beneath Ceaseless Skies, September 2012)
 Remembering Light (2010, Beneath Ceaseless Skies, June 2010)
 Smiling at the End of the World (no date found, www.swantower.com)
 The God of Driftwood (new)

Novellas

Varekai
 "Cold-Forged Flame" (September, 2016)
 "Lightning in the Blood" (May, 2017)

Short Stories
 White Shadow (2004)
(2005)
 Silence, Before the Horn (2005)
 Shadows' Bride (2005)
 The Twa Corbies (2005)
 For the Fairest (2005)
 Sing for Me (2006)
 The Wood, the Bridge, the House (2006)
 Such as Dreams Are Made Of (2006)
 Execution Morning (Glorifying Terrorism, 2007)
 A Thousand Souls (2007)
 But Who Shall Lead the Dance? (2007)
 Selection (2007)
 Nine Sketches, in Charcoal and Blood (2007)
 Lost Soul (2008)
 Kiss of Life (2008)
 Never After: Twelve Tales
 Beggar's Blessing
 The Deaths of Christopher Marlowe
 A Mask of Flesh
 Once a Goddess
 The Gospel of Nachash

Articles
 Mesoamerican Calendars (2004)
 The Logic of Sacrifice (2004)
 Bull-Leaping in Bronze Age Crete (2005)
 Ireland's Ancient Code (2005)
 That Fairy-Tale Feel: A Folkloric Approach to Meredith Ann Pierce's The Darkangel (2006)

References

External links

 Marie Brennan's personal web site
 Brennan's profile on Tor.com
 Midnight Never Come's official web site

1980 births
Living people
21st-century American novelists
American fantasy writers
American women short story writers
American women novelists
Harvard University alumni
Indiana University Bloomington alumni
Women science fiction and fantasy writers
21st-century American women writers
21st-century American short story writers